Leslie Hobart Deaton (September 23, 1923 – November 18, 1989) was an American professional basketball player and college head coach. After serving in World War II, he played in the National Basketball League the Sheboygan Red Skins and Waterloo Hawks and averaged 3.7 points per game for his career. Deaton also coached high school basketball in Iowa and then became the head coach at Simpson College for twelve seasons, where he played collegiately. Upon the close of his coaching career, he operated an insurance company and ran a campground before dying of a stroke in 1989.

References

1923 births
1989 deaths
United States Marine Corps personnel of World War II
American men's basketball coaches
American men's basketball players
Basketball coaches from Iowa
Basketball players from Iowa
Centers (basketball)
College men's basketball head coaches in the United States
Denison Big Red men's basketball players
Forwards (basketball)
High school basketball coaches in Iowa
Military personnel from Iowa
People from Carlisle, Iowa
Sheboygan Red Skins players
Simpson Storm men's basketball coaches
Simpson Storm men's basketball players
Waterloo Hawks players